The  is a  train service operated by Hokkaido Railway Company (JR Hokkaido) in Hokkaido, Japan, since 1988.

Service pattern and station stops
There is one train per day in each direction, with the journey taking approximately 3 hours 20 minutes from Asahikawa to Kitami.

Trains stop at the following stations.
  (A28)
 (A29)
 (A30)
 (A31)
 (A32)
 (A34)
  (A35)
  (A43)
  (A45)
  (A48)
  (A50)
  (A51)
  (A53)
  (A56)
  (A57)
  (A58)
  (A59)
  (A60)

Stations in brackets are only served by Kitami-bound trains.

Rolling stock
Services are formed of one or two single-car KiHa 54 diesel cars based at Asahikawa Depot. Very occasionally, KiHa 150 diesel trains may be used.

History

The Kitami service was first introduced from 19 March 1988 as a seasonal "limited rapid" train service. From 3 November 1988, it became a regular daily service.

From 13 March 2004, the train became entirely no-smoking.

References

Named passenger trains of Japan
Rail transport in Hokkaido
Railway services introduced in 1988